Dichelonyx backii, known generally as the green pine chafer or green rose chafer, is a species of scarab beetle in the family Scarabaeidae.

References

Further reading

 

Melolonthinae
Articles created by Qbugbot
Beetles described in 1837